Behdadin (also Romanized as Behdādīn; also known as Behdāden) is a village in Bostan Rural District, Sangan District, Khaf County, Razavi Khorasan Province, Iran. At the 2006 census, its population was 1,813, in 346 families.

See also 

 List of cities, towns and villages in Razavi Khorasan Province

References 

Khaf County